The Glasgow School for Business and Society is the largest business school in Scotland. It is part of Glasgow Caledonian University, and was established in 2002, originally named the Caledonian Business School. It offers programs in business studies, law and the social sciences. Its main campus is located in Glasgow, and it has an additional campus in London (GCU London). The school is also home to the Moffat Centre, one of the world’s leading university research centres in tourism and travel.

Departments
The school consists of three departments:
Department of Law, Economics, Accountancy and Risk
Department of Management
Department of Social Sciences, Media and Journalism

Management
The Executive Dean and Pro Vice-Chancellor is Professor John Wilson, and the Vice Dean is Professor Ailsa McKay.

References

External links
Glasgow School for Business and Society
 Moffat Centre
 

Glasgow Caledonian University
2002 establishments in Scotland
Business schools in Scotland